Rosa Silverio, in full Rosa de Jesús Silverio Filpo (born in Santiago de los Caballeros, Dominican Republic on August 30, 1978), is a Dominican poet and storyteller.

Biography
Silverio was born August 30, 1978 and currently resides in Madrid, Spain. She is a poet, a journalist, writer and cultural activist. Silverio's stories and poems have been published in magazines, literary supplements, and anthologies of various countries. Her literary works have been translated into languages such as English, French, Italian, Portuguese and Catalan.

Works
2005 – Desnuda, poesía. Editora Cole. Santo Domingo, R.D.
2002 – De vuelta a casa, poesía. Editora Centenario. Santo Domingo, R.D.
2007 – Rosa íntima, poesía. Editorial Santuario.
2010 – Selección poética, poesía.
2012 – Arma letal. La destrucción de las palabras.Ganador Premio Nacional de Poesía 2011 de la República Dominicana
2012 – A los delincuentes hay que matarlos. Prisa Ediciones.
2014 – Matar al Padre, poesía. Huerga y Fierro Editores
2016 – Mujer de lámpara encendida, poesíaa. Huerga y Fierro Editores.

Awards
 2011 – Premio Nacional Salomé Ureña, Santo Domingo, República Dominicana. 
 2005 – Vencedora Absoluta del XXI Premio Internacional Nosside de Poesía que organiza el Centro de Estudios Bosio de Regio de Calabria (Italia).
 2003 – Primer lugar en el concurso de cuento, poesía y ensayo que organiza la Alianza Cibaeña por su relato “La canción rota”.
 2001 – Mención por el cuento “La mueca” en el concurso de cuentos de Radio Santa María.
 1999	Tercer lugar en el concurso de cuento Colorín Colorado por su relato “La caja donde Alicia guarda sus secretos”.
 1999 – Mención especial por su cuento “Niki” en el concurso de cuento, poesía y ensayo de la Alianza Cibaeña.
 1998 – 
 1997 – Mención especial por el cuento “El ave que no podía volar” en el concurso de cuento, poesía y ensayo de la Alianza Cibaeña.

References

1978 births
Living people
21st-century Dominican Republic poets
Dominican Republic women writers
Dominican Republic women poets
Dominican Republic journalists
Dominican Republic women journalists
People from Santiago Province (Dominican Republic)
21st-century women writers
Dominican Republic people of Spanish descent
Dominican Republic expatriates in Spain